William Francis Mahar Sr. (January 1, 1919 – October 13, 2006) was an American politician.

Born in Belleville, Wisconsin, Mahar served in the United States Army during World War II and was a commissioned colonel. He participated in the Battle of the Bulge and was a Bronze Star recipient. He went to the University of Wisconsin, where he studied history and political science. He served on the Homewood, Illinois village board and as village president. Mahar served in the Illinois House of Representatives from 1973 to 1981 and was a Republican. Mahar then served in the Illinois Senate from 1981 to 1985. His son William F. Mahar Jr. also served in the Illinois General Assembly.

Notes

External links

1919 births
2006 deaths
People from Belleville, Wisconsin
People from Homewood, Illinois
Military personnel from Wisconsin
University of Wisconsin–Madison College of Letters and Science alumni
Illinois city council members
Mayors of places in Illinois
Republican Party members of the Illinois House of Representatives
Republican Party Illinois state senators
20th-century American politicians
United States Army personnel of World War II